Steve Robert McFadden (né Reid; born 20 March 1959) is an English actor. He is best known for his role as Phil Mitchell in the BBC One soap opera EastEnders, which he has played since 1990. He was also the presenter of the game show, Britain's Hardest.

Early life
McFadden was born in Maida Vale, London, on 20 March 1959. He left school in 1975, and had short stints in jobs including labouring, carrot picking, plumbing and working at a builder's merchant. After attending university, McFadden decided that he wanted to become an actor and was accepted into the Royal Academy of Dramatic Art in 1984, graduating in 1987.

Career
McFadden made his acting debut playing a small role in the 1989 BBC television film The Firm. That same year, he had an uncredited brief appearance in the film Buster as a gang member. This was followed by appearances in the television series The Bill, Minder and Bergerac.

McFadden then began portraying the role of Phil Mitchell in the BBC soap opera EastEnders. He joined EastEnders at the beginning of 1990, at the same time as Ross Kemp, who played Phil's younger brother Grant Mitchell. During that time, his character was involved in numerous iconic storylines, such as Sharongate (where it was revealed that he had an affair with his brother's wife Sharon) in 1994, and the Who Shot Phil? storyline in March 2001; where his character was shot and wounded by a mystery attacker.

McFadden then made an appearance in the film Kevin & Perry Go Large in 2000, and starred in an episode of the BBC anthology series Murder in Mind in 2001. He left EastEnders in late 2003 for a one-year break to concentrate on pantomimes. His character was written out of the series after being framed for an armed robbery by Den Watts (played by Leslie Grantham), and going on the run after breaking out of prison.

During his break from EastEnders, he presented the reality television series Britain's Hardest which was an underground competition broadcast on Sky One. He returned to EastEnders for two episodes in April 2005. In the story, Phil returned to Walford in need of financial help, only to be arrested and returned to prison. In October 2005, he returned on a permanent basis, after his character was cleared of armed robbery. In 2007, he appeared in the film Provoked. He has also appeared as Captain Hook in a pantomime production of Peter Pan from 2010 to 2011 at The Swan.

Personal life
McFadden has five children. His son Matt McFadden's mother is Sue Marshall, and Angela Bostock is the mother of his daughters Teona and Mollie Jane. Rachel Sidwell gave birth to his daughter Amelie Tinkerbell on 29 June 2009. At the time she was his partner, but the couple split two months later. A fifth child, a daughter named Frankie, was born to his girlfriend Karen Cairns in June 2016.

McFadden is a sailor and took part in the Thames Diamond Jubilee Pageant in his motorboat 'Barbara'. In 2014, he sued the Metropolitan Police and News of the World after a police officer sold details about him to the newspaper. He sued News of the World after one of their journalists admitted trying to intercept his voicemail messages in the News International phone hacking scandal. McFadden stated "I am particularly concerned that a police officer sold my privacy to a tabloid newspaper for profit. I consider the payment of damages and public apology will go some way to ensuring respect for my and others' privacy in future. I am glad to have been vindicated and to be able to put this matter behind me".

Drink driving conviction
In 1996, McFadden was banned from driving for 18 months and fined £1000 plus £350 in costs after pleading guilty to drink-driving after attending a party at a London nightclub.

Cold War Steve
McFadden, in his role as Phil Mitchell, is a recurrent character in the satirical collages by Cold War Steve, the Twitter handle of artist Christopher Spencer. Spencer's Twitter feed was originally called McFadden's Cold War and then later renamed as Cold War Steve. McFadden has appeared in over a hundred of the artworks.

Filmography

Awards and nominations

References

External links
 
 

1959 births
Living people
20th-century English male actors
21st-century English male actors
Alumni of RADA
English male film actors
English male soap opera actors
English male stage actors
English male television actors
Male actors from London
People from Maida Vale